Following is a list of senators of Drôme, people who have represented the department of Drôme in the Senate of France.

Third Republic

Senators for Drôme under the French Third Republic were:

Jean Lamorte (1876–1884)
César Malens (1876–1885)
Émile Loubet (1885–1899)
Joseph Fayard (1885–1908)
Antoine Chevandier (1892–1893)
Paul Laurens (1893–1901)
Louis Bizarelli (1899–1902)
Maurice-Louis Faure (1902–1919)
Louis Blanc (1903–1914)
Charles-Marie Chabert (1908–1923)
Joseph Reynaud (1920–1924)
Henri Perdrix (1920–1945)
Émile Lisbonne (1924–1939)
Désiré Valette (1924–1939)
François Eynard (1939–1945)
Félix Rozier (1939–1945)

Fourth Republic

Senators for Drôme under the French Fourth Republic were:

André Bossanne (1946–1948)
Albin Vilhet (1946–1948)
Marius Moutet (1948–1959)
Maurice Pic (politician) (1948–1959)

Fifth Republic 
Senators for Drôme under the French Fifth Republic:

References

Sources

 
Lists of members of the Senate (France) by department